Idol is Dead (stylized IDOL is DEAD) is the second studio album released by Japanese idol group BiS on October 28, 2012. It is their first original album released on a major label, as well as the first (and only) full album released with the "Quintet" lineup (Pour Lui, Nozomi Hirano, Yufu Terashima, Rio Michibayashi, and Yurika Wakisaka). The album continues the style of BiS's previous releases, containing songs of different types of rock. It also continues the tradition of their studio albums containing a cover, in this case Shinichi Osawa's "Our Song", arranged in a Shoegaze style. The four tracks ("nerve", "My Ixxx", "primal." and "IDOL") from their independent label days have been re-recorded.

Releases 
Three basic types of the album were released; A standard edition with 1 CD (limited pressings also contained a random photo); A "Movie" edition with 1 CD and a DVD containing the film "IDOL is DEAD -The Movie-" which the group starred in, as well as live footage from their performance at "MOOSIC LAB Re:KICK OFF PARTY!"; A "MV" edition with 1 CD and a DVD containing all of the group's music videos released at the time. In addition, limited editions of the "Movie" and "MV" editions featuring alternate paper sleeve covers and including a random photo were released, bringing the total number of versions to 5.

Cover art
The artwork for this album, being BiS's first album on a major label, helped identify and emphasise the shock oriented "Un-Idol like" image that they would go on to be known for. The artwork for the limited editions of the "MV" and "Movie" editions show the members posing while being placed in a Guillotine. The artwork for the standard versions shows the members trapped behind bars resembling a jail cell. These covers, combined with the album title, produced an image quite different from other idol groups when released.

Track listing

Personnel
BiS - Lyrics on Tracks 2, 3, 8, 10 and 13
Pour Lui – vocals
Nozomi Hirano – vocals
Yufu Terashima – vocals; Lyrics on Track 12
Rio Michibayashi – vocals; Lyrics on Track 4
Yurika Wakisaka – vocals
Kenta Matsukuma – Sound producer; all instruments
Takumi Asada – Guitar and Bass guitar on Track 5 
Sho Sakafumi – Guitar on Track 5
Satoshi Aoki – Guitar on Track 6
Keita Kitajima – Bass guitar on Tracks 3 and 9
megane – Bass guitar on Track 11
Takashi Todoroki – Drums on Tracks 3, 4, 5, 8 and 13
Takuya  Kusunose – Drums on Tracks 9 and 10
Studio-Novel – Art Direction and Design
Katsuto Matsuura – executive producer
Hikaru Yamaguchi – executive producer

Notes
All writing, arrangement and personnel credits taken from the album insert.

References

2012 albums
Bis (Japanese idol group) albums